The Kurchaloy Islamic Institute named after A-Kh. It's the first islamic instite in the North Caucasus.

History 
In 1988, a religious figure, entrepreneur, philanthropist, Nasuha-Khadzhi Akhmatov founded the first "North Caucasian Madrasah" in the North Caucasus, where everyone had the opportunity to study the canons of the Islamic religion, at the same time he turned to Akhmad Kadyrov for support in order to implement his plans. At that time, Akhmad-Khadzhi Kadyrov was a specialist scientist-theologian. He graduated from the Bukhara madrasah "Mir-i Arab" and the Tashkent Islamic Institute. Initially, the institute was named in honor of the founder of Nasuha-Khadzhi Akhmatov.

On April 29, 1991, the madrasah was transformed into a higher religious educational institution, the Kurchaloyev Islamic Institute. In 2004, after the death of the President of the Chechen Republic Akhmad-Khadzhi Kadyrov, on the initiative of Nasuha-Khadzhi Akhmatov, the institute was renamed the Kurchaloyev Islamic Institute named after A-Kh. Kadyrov.

In 2007, at the initiative of the President of the Chechen Republic Ramzan Kadyrov, the reconstruction of the Islamic university was carried out. New buildings were built: administrative and academic buildings, a dormitory with 220 seats, a dining room and a gym.

Education 
Over the years of the institute's existence, more than 700 students with specialties imam theologian and teacher of the Arabic became its graduates. As of 2018, 332 students studied at the institute. The institute has 13 branches in the Chechen Republic.

References

External links 
  

Universities in Russia
Buildings and structures in Chechnya
Islamic universities and colleges
Religious schools in Russia